The 1993 San Francisco Giants season was the Giants' 111th season in Major League Baseball, their 36th season in San Francisco since their move from New York following the 1957 season, and their 34th season at Candlestick Park. It was the first season with Dusty Baker as manager, having been promoted from previously serving as the hitting coach under Roger Craig. In the offseason, under new ownership and general manager, Barry Bonds left the Pittsburgh Pirates to sign a lucrative free agent contract worth a then-record $43.75 million over six years with the Giants, with whom his father, Bobby Bonds, spent the first seven years of his career, and with whom his godfather Willie Mays played 22 of his 24 Major League seasons. The deal was, at that time, the largest in baseball history, in terms of both total value and average annual salary. To honor his father, Bonds switched his jersey number to 25 once he signed with the Giants, as it had been Bobby's number in San Francisco (His number during most of his stay with the Pirates, 24, was already retired in honor of Mays). Bonds hit .336 in 1993, leading the league with 46 home runs and 123 RBI en route to his second consecutive MVP award and third overall (of an eventual seven).

As good as the Giants were (winning 103 games), the Atlanta Braves won 104 in what some call the last great pennant race (due to the Wild Card being instituted the following season). After leading the National League West by ten games on July 22, and still holding a -game lead a month later, the Giants went 6–15 and relinquished the division lead to the Braves. The Giants then went on a 14–2 run, which left them tied with the Braves with one game remaining, which they lost 12–1 to the 80–81 Los Angeles Dodgers to become the only National League team to win 100 or more games and not make the playoffs in the divisional play era.

Offseason
On November 10, 1992, National League owners voted 9–4 against allowing Giants owner Bob Lurie to sell the team for $115 million to a Tampa Bay group, which would have moved the Giants to the Florida Suncoast Dome in time for the 1993 season.

November 17, 1992: Steve Decker was drafted by the Florida Marlins from the San Francisco Giants as the 35th pick in the 1992 expansion draft.
 December 8, 1992: Barry Bonds signed as a free agent with the San Francisco Giants.
 December 10, 1992: Jim Pena was traded by the San Francisco Giants to the San Diego Padres for Paul Faries.

Regular season
During the season, John Burkett and Bill Swift would be the last pitchers to win at least 20 games in one season for the Giants in the 20th century.

Opening Day Starters
Barry Bonds
John Burkett
Will Clark
Royce Clayton
Kirt Manwaring
Dave Martinez
Willie McGee
Robby Thompson
Matt Williams

Season standings

Record vs. opponents

Notable Transactions
August 3, 1993: Scott Sanderson was selected off waivers by the San Francisco Giants from the California Angels.
August 28, 1993: Jim DeShaies was traded by the Minnesota Twins to the San Francisco Giants for a player to be named later, Aaron Fultz, and Andres Duncan (minors). The San Francisco Giants sent Greg Brummett (September 1, 1993) to the Minnesota Twins to complete the trade.

Draft picks
June 3, 1993: Steve Soderstrom was drafted by the San Francisco Giants in the 1st round (6th pick) of the 1993 amateur draft. Player signed July 28, 1993.
June 3, 1993: Bill Mueller was drafted by the San Francisco Giants in the 15th round of the 1993 amateur draft. Player signed June 4, 1993.

Major League debuts
Batters: 
Rikkert Faneyte (Aug 29) 
 Erik Johnson (Jul 8)  
J.R. Phillips (Sep 3)  
Pitchers: 
Greg Brummett (May 29)  
Salomon Torres (Aug 29)

Roster

Player stats

Batting

Starters by position
Note: Pos = Position; G = Games played; AB = At bats; H = Hits; HR = Home runs; RBI = Runs batted in; Avg.= Batting average

Other batters
Note: G = Games played; AB = At bats; H = Hits; Avg. = Batting average; HR = Home runs; RBI = Runs batted in

Starting pitchers 
Note: G= Games pitched; IP= Innings pitched: W= Wins; L= Losses; ERA= Earned run average; SO= Strikeouts

Other pitchers 
Note: G = Games pitched; IP = Innings pitched; W = Wins; L = Losses; ERA = Earned run average; SO = Strikeouts

Relief pitchers 
Note: G= Games pitched; IP= innings pitched; W= Wins; L= Losses; SV= Saves; ERA= Earned run average; SO= Strikeouts

Awards and honors
 Barry Bonds, National League Most Valuable Player
 Barry Bonds, National League leader, Home Runs and Runs Batted In
 Kirt Manwaring C, Willie Mac Award
All-Star Game

Farm system

References

External links
 1993 San Francisco Giants team page at Baseball Reference
 1993 San Francisco Giants team page at Baseball Almanac

San Francisco Giants seasons
San Francisco Giants season
1993 in San Francisco
San Fran